La Damigella di Scalot, or Donna di Scalotta, is a thirteenth-century Italian romance novellina, i.e. a very short story, included in the collection Il Novellino: Le ciento novelle antike (Novellino. The hundred ancient tales) as the 82nd tale. It tells the story of the unrequited love of the titular Lady of Scalot for Sir Lancelot and the subsequent death of the lady by lovesickness.

The character of the Lady of Scalot is based on the Arthurian legend of Elaine of Astolat. Alfred Lord Tennyson wrote a poem on the same topic titled "The Lady of Shalott".

The original story from Il Novellino, translated in English

References

Medieval Italian literature
13th-century novels
Arthurian literature
Italian historical novels
Italian novels